PGB may refer to:

 Polska Grupa Badawcza, an opinion poll institute
 Precision guided bomb, guided weapons designed to cause minimum collateral damage
 Pingat Gagah Berani, an order of valour granted by the Government of Malaysia